A Better Montenegro is a broad opposition coalition in Montenegro made up virtually the entire opposition. It is led by the three only parliamentary opposition parties, Socialist People's Party of Montenegro, New Serb Democracy and the Movement for Changes and the political alliance is led by the three leaders of those parties Srđan Milić, Andrija Mandić and Nebojša Medojević.

History
It was formed in 2009 before the forthcoming local elections after negotiations in the opposition which included continuing the boycott of al local elections as in 2009 or forming one common list of almost the entire Montenegrin opposition. 

It was the biggest gathering of the Montenegrin opposition since introduction of parliamentarism in 1990 in Montenegro. Milić had negotiated with Montenegrin President Filip Vujanović on the participation of the opposition, which boycotts elections considering them illegal and unjust because of the flaws in the electoral law which should have been reformed when new Constitution was brought up in 2007 and they made a deal to organize general local elections in the remaining 14 municipalities all round which still haven't had elections since independence. The coalition won more than 50% of votes only in Pljevlja municipality.

Composing parties

References

External links 
 Socialist People's Party of Montenegro
 New Serb Democracy
 Movement for Changes

Defunct political party alliances in Montenegro
Pro-European political parties in Montenegro